The 2nd High School in Wrocław (or II Liceum Ogólnokształcące im. Piastów Śląskich we Wrocławiu) is a public high school in Wrocław, Poland. The school is named after Silesian Piasts and is part of the 22nd Secondary School Complex, located at Parkowa 18–26 Street. The school was built in 1929, on the former site of "Mary Magdalene's Gymnasium".

Shortly after World War II the building was destined as middle school and secondary school, and soon – after education reform – merged into a secondary school. After many years of operating it earned, thanks to inter alia hard work of long-term mentor to the School's Sports Circle and P.E. teacher, Adam Dotzauer, a reputation of a sport's school, and later on a title of the School of Sport's Mastery.

Notable alumni 

 Maciej Popowicz – creator of nasza-klasa.pl
 Kinga Preis – Polish actress
 Wanda Rutkiewicz – Polish mountaineer, the first woman to successfully summit K2
 Andrzej Siemieniewski – Auxiliary bishop of Wrocław, Professor of Theology

References

External links 
 Homepage
 11–12.04.2015 – IV Wrocław Model Show takes place at 2nd High School in Wrocław
 Recruitment for the school year 2017-2018

Education in Wrocław
03
1929 establishments in Poland